The Virgin Gorda Ballstarz, commonly known as VG Ballstarz is a British Virgin Islands football club that competes in the BVIFA National Football League.

Former players

  Jhon Samuel (former international)
  Andreas Norford (former international)
 Troy Caesar

References

External links 
 Soccerway profile

Virgin Gorda